IDEA Carver Academy is a public charter school located in San Antonio, Texas, USA. Initially established as a Christian private school, Carver Academy was founded by David Robinson, former NBA basketball player with the San Antonio Spurs, and his wife Valerie. The school was founded in 2001 and is named after George Washington Carver. In 2012, the Carver Academy converted to a tuition-free, charter school as part of the IDEA Public Schools network. In April 2019, Carver became the first IDEA graduating class in San Antonio.

References
A Spur to Success
Carver Academy draws on firm's creative bug

External links
IDEA Carver Academy Website

Schools in San Antonio
Private elementary schools in Texas